The Ancient One is a comic book character, the mentor of Doctor Strange.

Ancient One may also refer to:

 Ancient One (Marvel Cinematic Universe), the film version of the comics character
 Kennewick Man, a prehistoric Paleoamerican man, known as the Ancient One by several Native American tribes
 The Ancient One, a character from Ronin Warriors
 The Ancient One (novel), a 1992 novel by T. A. Barron
"The Ancient One" (Teenage Mutant Ninja Turtles), a 2005 episode of Teenage Mutant Ninja Turtles (2003 TV series) (season 4)
The Ancient One, a nickname for Abraham Lincoln, the sixteenth president of United States

See also
 Old One (disambiguation)